Protein kinase C beta type is an enzyme that in humans is encoded by the PRKCB gene.

Protein kinase C (PKC) is a family of serine- and threonine-specific protein kinases that can be activated by calcium and second messenger diacylglycerol. PKC family members phosphorylate a wide variety of protein targets and are known to be involved in diverse cellular signaling pathways. PKC family members also serve as major receptors for phorbol esters, a class of tumor promoters. Each member of the PKC family has a specific expression profile and is believed to play a distinct role in cells. The protein encoded by this gene is one of the PKC family members. This protein kinase has been reported to be involved in many different cellular functions, such as B cell activation, apoptosis induction, endothelial cell proliferation, and intestinal sugar absorption. Studies in mice also suggest that this kinase may also regulate neuronal functions and correlate fear-induced conflict behavior after stress. Alternatively spliced transcript variants encoding distinct isoforms have been reported. This gene could be associated with autism.

Interactions 

PRKCB1 has been shown to interact with RIPK4, beta adrenergic receptor kinase, PDLIM5 and GNB2L1.

See also 
Protein kinase C

References

Further reading 

 
 
 

EC 2.7.11